Danish Chronicles, annals and historical works from antiquity to medieval times. These books / writings (and others) form the bases of knowledge for early Danish history.

Chronicles and historical works

 Brevis Historia Regum Dacie (Sven Aggesen Danmarkshistorie)
 Chronica Jutensis (Jydske Krønike)
 Chronicon Lethrense (Lejrekrøniken)
 Chronicon Roskildense (Roskildekrøniken)
 Chronica Sialandie 1028-1307 (Yngre Sjællandske Krønike)
 Chronica Sialandie 1308-1366 (Ældre Sjællandske Krønike)
 Compendium Saxonis (Saxo kompendia i Jyske Krønike)
 Gesta Danorum (Saxos Danmarkshistorie)
 Skibby Chronicle (Skibby-krøniken)

Annales

 Annales ad annum 1290 perducti (Annalistiske Noter, der ender 1290)
 Annales Albiani
 Annales Colbazenses (Colbaz arbogen)
 Annales Dano-Suecani 916-1263 (Dansk-Svensk årbog 916-1263)
 Annales Essenbecenses (Essenbæk årbogen)
 Annales Lundenses (Lunde årbogen)
 Annales Nestvedienses 821-1300 (Den Yngre Næstved årbog)
 Annales Nestvedienses 1130-1228 (Den Ældre Næstved årbog)
 Annales Ripenses (Ribe årbogen)
 Annales Ryenses (Ryd årbogen) (sometimes also known as Chronicon Erici Regis)
 Annales Scanici (Skaanske årbog)
 Annales Slesuicenses (Slesvig årbog 1270)
 Annales Sorani 1130-1300 (Den Yngre Sorø årbog)
 Annales Sorani 1202-1347 (Den Ældre Sorø årbog)
 Annales Waldemariani (Valdemar årbogen)
 Annales 67 –1287
 Annales 980-1286
 Annales 841-1006
 Annales 1095-1194
 Annales 1098-1325
 Annales 1101-1313 (Annaludtog 1101-1313)
 Annales 1246-1265
 Annales 1259-1286
 Annales 1275-1347 (Årbogfragment 1275-1347)
 Annalibus Dano-Suecani 826-1415 (Dansk-Svensk årbog 826-1415)
 Collectanea Petri Olai (Franciskanermunken Peder Olsens Collectanea)

Laws

 Codex Holmiensis (Jyske Lov)
 Valdemar's Zealandic Law (Valdemars Sjællandske Lov)
 Erik's Zealandic Law (Eriks Sjællandske Lov)
 Codex Runicus (Skaanske Lov)

Lists

 Series Regum Danie ex Necrologio Lundensi
 Catalogus Regum Danie
 Series ac breuior historia regum Danie
 Reges Danorum
 Nomina Regum Danorum
 Wilhelmi Abbatis Genealogia Regum Danorum
 Incerti Auctoris Genealogia Regum Daniæ

Others

 Planctus de captiuitate regum Danorum
 Planctus de statu regni Danie

 
Denmark history-related lists